The Miss Wisconsin competition is the pageant, held annually in Oshkosh, that selects the representative for the U.S. state of Wisconsin in the Miss America pageant. Wisconsin has won the Miss America crown three times (1973, 2012, and 2023).

Grace Stanke of Wausau was crowned Miss Wisconsin 2022 on June 18, 2022. She represented Wisconsin and won the title of Miss America 2023 in December 2022. On December 26, 2022 the Miss Wisconsin Organization announced 1st runner-up Kylene Spanbauer of Fond du Lac will assume the title of Miss Wisconsin 2022.

Results summary
The following is a visual summary of the past results of Miss Wisconsin titleholders at the national Miss America pageants/competitions. The year in parentheses indicates the year of the national competition during which a placement and/or award was garnered, not the year attached to the contestant's state title.

Placements
 Miss Americas: Terry Meeuwsen (1973), Laura Kaeppeler (2012), Grace Stanke (2023) 
 1st runners-up: Mary Alice Fox (1960), Joan Mary Engh (1963), Judith Hieke (1974)
 2nd runners-up: Barbara Burk Baugh (1968), Tina Sauerhammer (2004)
 3rd runners-up: N/A
 4th runners-up: Sharon Singstock (1966)
 Top 8: Christina Thompson (2008)
 Top 10: Keungsuk Kim (1982), Tania Ziegler (1994), Mary-Louise Kurey (2000)
 Top 12: Paula Mae Kuiper (2014)
 Top 15: Clara Koehler (1924), Betty Miller (1941), Phyllis Ann Kessler (1949), Tianna Vanderhei (2019)
 Top 16: Antoine Lunde (1946)
 Top 18: Marie Marguerite Huebner (1933)

Awards

Preliminary awards
 Preliminary Lifestyle and Fitness: Mary Alice Fox (1960), Joan Engh (1963), Terry Meeuwsen (1973), Judy Hieke (1974)
 Preliminary On Stage Interview: Tianna Vanderhei (2019)
 Preliminary Talent: Terry Meeuwsen (1973), Maria Kim (1988), Mary-Louise Kurey (2000), Tina Sauerhammer (2004), Laura Kaeppeler (2012), Grace Stanke (2023)

Non-finalist awards
 Non-finalist Interview: Nicole Jean Locy (1998)
 Non-finalist Talent: Lynn Byron Holden (1957), Marilyn Sembell (1976), Gail Soller (1983), Maria Kim (1988), Tricia Luedtke (1991), Stephanie Klett (1993), Joya Zamora (2001)

Other awards
 Miss Congeniality: N/A
 Bernie Wayne Performing Arts Award: Mary-Louise Kurey (2000)
 Dr. David B. Allman Medical Scholarship: Carol Schmitt (1975)
 Quality of Life Award Finalists: Laura Herriot (2002), Molly McGrath (2005)
 Special Education Award: Carol Ann Schmitt (1975)
 Special Scholarship Award: Barbara Jean Bonville (1964)
STEM Scholarship 2nd runner-up: Jennifer Marie Schmidt (2022)

Winners

Notes

References

External links

 Miss Wisconsin official website

Wisconsin
Wisconsin culture
Women in Wisconsin
1924 establishments in Wisconsin
Recurring events established in 1924
Annual events in Wisconsin